The 2021–22 CAF Champions League group stage were played from 11 February to 3 April 2022. A total of 16 teams competed in the group stage to decide the eight places in the knockout stage of the 2021–22 CAF Champions League.

Times are in local times.

Draw
The draw for the group stage was held on 28 December 2021, 11:30 GMT (13:30 local time, UTC+2), at the CAF headquarters in Cairo, Egypt. The 16 winners of the second round of qualifying were drawn into four groups of four.

The teams were seeded by their performances in the CAF competitions for the previous five seasons (CAF 5-Year Ranking points shown next to every team). Each group contained one team from each of Pot 1, Pot 2, Pot 3, and Pot 4, and each team was allocated to the positions in their group according to their pot.

Format
In the group stage, each group was played on a home-and-away round-robin basis. The winners and runners-up of each group advanced to the quarter-finals of the knockout stage.

Tiebreakers
The teams were ranked according to points (3 points for a win, 1 point for a draw, 0 points for a loss). If tied on points, tiebreakers were applied in the following order (Regulations III. 20 & 21):
Points in head-to-head matches among tied teams;
Goal difference in head-to-head matches among tied teams;
Goals scored in head-to-head matches among tied teams;
Away goals scored in head-to-head matches among tied teams;
If more than two teams were tied, and after applying all head-to-head criteria above, a subset of teams were still tied, all head-to-head criteria above were reapplied exclusively to this subset of teams;
Goal difference in all group matches;
Goals scored in all group matches;
Away goals scored in all group matches;
Drawing of lots.

Schedule
The schedule of each matchday was as follows.

Groups

Group A

Group B

Group C

Group D

Notes

References

External links
CAFonline.com

2
February 2022 sports events in Africa
March 2022 sports events in Africa
April 2022 sports events in Africa